The Standard is one of the largest newspapers in Kenya with a 48% market share. It is the oldest newspaper in the country and is owned by The Standard Group, which also runs the Kenya Television Network (KTN), Radio Maisha, The Nairobian (a weekly tabloid), KTN News and Standard Digital which is its online platform. The Standard Group is headquartered on Mombasa Road, Nairobi, having moved from its previous premises at the I&M Bank Tower.

History
The newspaper was established as the African Standard in 1902 as a weekly by Alibhai Mulla Jeevanjee, an immigrant businessman from British India. In 1905 Jeevanjee sold the paper to Maia Anderson and Rudolf Franz Mayer, who changed the name to the East African Standard. It became a daily paper and moved its headquarters from Mombasa to Nairobi in 1910. At the time the newspaper declared strongly colonialist viewpoints. The British-based Lonrho Group bought the newspaper in 1963, only a few months before Kenya's independence (they were a colony of Britain). The paper changed its name to The Standard in 1977 but the name East African Standard was revived later. It was sold to Kenyan investors in 1995. In 2004 the name was changed back to The Standard. It is the main rival to Kenya's largest newspaper, the Daily Nation. In 1989, at a time when Kenya was going into multi-party era, the Standard Group acquired the KTN Television Channel. It is the oldest newspaper published in Kenya. The top editors at the Standard Group include Kipkoech Tanui (The Standard, Daily Editions) and John Bundotich (Weekend Editions) with Charles Otieno editing The Nairobian. The head of Radio Maisha is Tom Japanni, KTN Managing Editor is Ellen Wanjiru, while Standard Digital Managing Editor is Carole Kimutai.

Premises raid, 2006
In late February 2006 The Standard ran a story claiming that president Mwai Kibaki and senior opposition figure Kalonzo Musyoka had been holding secret meetings. At 1:00 am local time (2200 UTC), on 2 March, masked gunmen carrying AK-47s raided the editorial office of The Standard, and of its television station KTN. They kicked and beat staff members, forcibly took computers and transmission equipment, burned all the copies of the 2 March edition of the newspaper, and damaged the presses. At KTN, they shut down its flow of electricity, putting the station off the air. Initially, the Kenyan information minister claimed no knowledge of the raid, but has since revealed that Kenyan police were responsible, and stated that the incident was to safeguard state security. "If you rattle a snake you must be prepared to be bitten by it," John Michuki said. Three journalists at The Standard, arrested after the critical story was printed, were released on 2 March on bail of 50,000 Kenyan shillings (US$692).

References

External links
 
 Standard Digital, also a product of The Standard Group Limited

Newspapers published in Kenya
Publications established in 1902
1902 establishments in Kenya
Mass media in Nairobi